Blackbirds at Bangpleng is a 1994 Thai science fiction horror film. Though it is based on a novel by the famous Thai writer and politician Kukrit Pramoj, the story closely mirrors the 1957 novel The Midwich Cuckoos by John Wyndham, which itself was adapted into the 1960 film, Village of the Damned.

Plot

A village in rural Thailand is celebrating Loy Krathong, when the festivities are disrupted by the descent of a spaceship. Ray beams are fired from the craft and all the village's women find they are suddenly pregnant. Only a few hours later the women give birth. The alien offspring have the power to kill by just staring and they have an insatiable appetite for raw meat.

Further reading
 Close encounters of the generic kind: A case study in Thai sci-fi, essay by Adam Knee, Screening the Past, La Trobe University, November 1, 2000.

References

External links
 
 

1994 films
Films based on science fiction novels
Thai-language films
Thai horror films
1990s science fiction horror films
1994 horror films